Emanuel Navarrete Martínez (born 17 January 1995) is a Mexican professional boxer. He is a three-division world champion, having held the WBO junior featherweight title from 2018 to 2020, the WBO featherweight title from 2020 to 2023, and the WBO junior lightweight title since February 2023. As of October 2022, he is ranked as the world's best active featherweight by The Ring and ESPN, second by the Transnational Boxing Rankings Board and BoxRec.

Amateur career
Navarrete had an amateur record of 108–7.

Professional career

WBO junior featherweight champion

The Dogboe duology
Navarrete made his professional debut against Misael Ramirez on February 18, 2012. He won the fight by a first-round technical knockout. Navarrete amassed a 25–1 record during the next six years, winning all but three of those fights by way of stoppage.

It was announced on October 17, 2018, that Navarrete would challenge the reigning WBO junior featherweight champion Isaac Dogboe, in what was Dogboe's second title defense. The bout was scheduled for the undercard of a December 8, 2018, Top Rank card headlined by a unified lightweight title fight between Vasyl Lomachenko and Jose Pedraza. The event took place at the Hulu Theater in New York City and was broadcast by ESPN in the Americas and by VITV in Dogboe's native Ghana. Navarrete entered the first title bout of his career as a significant underdog, with most odds-makers having him a +500 underdog, while Dogboe was seen as a -800 favorite. Despite this, Navarrete won the fight by unanimous decision. Two of the judges scored the fight 116–112 for him, while the third judge scored it 115–113 in his favor. Dogboe dropped Navarrete with a right hand in the ninth round, but no knockdown was called, as referee Benjy Esteves Jr. deemed it an illegal punch. The fight ended with Navarrete having landed (221 to 176) and thrown (804 to 686) more punches than Dogboe.

The pair was scheduled to fight an immediate rematch on May 11, 2019, at the Convention Center in Tucson, Arizona. The rematch headlined a Top Rank card, broadcast by ESPN. Navarrete was more convincing in their second meeting, winning the fight by a later twelfth-round technical knockout. He was in control from the beginning of the fight, keeping Dogboe at range with jabs and accumulating damage with straight punches. Navarrete began to dominate from the ninth round onward, with the former champion visibly flagging. Doboe's father and coach finally threw in the towel in the final minute of the last round. Navarrete landed almost three times as many strikes as Dogboe, out-landing the Ghanaian 314 to 121 in total punches.

Navarrete vs. De Vaca
It was revealed by ESPN on June 14, 2019, that Navarrete was expected to make his second title defense against the undefeated Francisco De Vaca at a date, location and venue which would be announced later. The fight was originally scheduled for the José Benavidez Jr. and Luis Collazo undercard, but was later promoted to headline the August 17 Top Rank card, after Benavidez withdrew due to injury. The fight took place at the Banc of California Stadium on Los Angeles, California, and was broadcast by ESPN. Navarrete justified his role as the betting favorite, winning the fight by a third-round technical knockout. Navarrete spent the entirety of the fight pressuring De Vaca, undeterred by the power coming back at him, finally finishing his opponent with a flurry of punches at the 1:54 minute mark of the third round.

Navarrete vs. Elorde
Five days after Navarrete made his second title defense, Top Rank vice-president Carl Moretti confirmed that Navarrete would make his third title defense against the #2 ranked WBO junior featherweight Juan Miguel Elorde. The fight was booked for the undercard of the Tyson Fury and Otto Wallin heavyweight bout, which took place on September 14, 2019, just 28 days after Navarrete's previous fight. The fight was broadcast on BT Sport and ESPN+ pay per view. Navarrete came into the fight as a -3000 favorite. Navarrete won the fight by a fourth-round technical knockout. He first knocked Elored down in the third round, before stopping him with a flurry of punches a round later.

Navarrete vs. Horta
Navarrete was booked to make his fourth title WBO junior featherweight title defense against Francisco Horta, in his fourth fight of the year. The fight was scheduled as for the undercard of an ESPN broadcast Top Rank card which took place on December 7, 2019, at the Auditorio GNP Seguros in Puebla, Mexico. It was Navarrete's first title fight in his native Mexico. Navarrete won the fight by a fourth-round technical knockout. After a slow start, Navarrete began catching Horta with looping punches, finally stopping his opponent at the 2:09 minute mark of the fourth round.

Navarrete vs. Santisima
On January 30, 2020, it was announced that Navarrete would make the fifth defense of his title against Jeo Santisima. The fight was booked for the Deontay Wilder vs. Tyson Fury II pay per view undercard, which took place at the MGM Grand Garden Arena in Paradise, Nevada on February 22, 2020. Navarrete once again justified his role as the favorite, winning the fight by an eleventh-round stoppage. Navarrete appeared to be unusually slow and fatigued throughout the bout, but still managed to stagger the Filipino challenger in the fifth round, before stopping him with a barrage of punches at the 2:20 minute mark of the eleventh round. Navarrete claimed that he had suffered a right thumb injury during the post-fight interview, saying: "I hurt him weirdly with my right hand and hurt my thumb but I had to plough through it".

WBO featherweight champion

Navarrete vs. Villa
Navarrete accepted a fight at featherweight against Uriel López on June 20, 2020, for his next bout. He won the fight by a sixth-round technical knockout. He dominated his opponent, out-landing him 190 to 49 in total punches, and 150 to 38 in power punches. Following this victory, Navarrete claimed he would vacate his junior featherweight title in the post-fight interview, should the other champions refuse to face him in a title unification bout. Navarrete officially vacated the WBO junior featherweight title on July 12, 2020, and moved up to featherweight. Due to the rules of the sanctioning body, he immediately became the mandatory challenger for the vacant WBO featherweight title.

The WBO ordered their #2 ranked featherweight contender Jessie Magdaleno to face mandatory challenger and #1 ranked contender Navarrete for the vacant title. As the two camps were unable to come to terms regarding the bout, the WBO ordered a purse bid to be held, which was won by Top Rank with a bid of $250,000. Although the fight was initially expected to take place in October of the same year, the idea was later scrapped as Magdaleno failed to respond to a Top Rank contract offer, unsatisfied with the proposed purse. As such, the next highest ranked contender Ruben Villa accepted the fight instead. The fight for the vacant belt between Navarrete and Villa was booked as the main event of an October 9, 2020, ESPN broadcast card.

Navarette won the fight by unanimous decision, slightly edging Villa on the strength of two knockdowns. He first knocked Villa down with a left uppercut near the end of the first round, while the second knockdown was the result of a left hook in the fourth round. Two of the judges scored the fight 114–112 in his favor, while the third judge awarded him a 115–111 scorecard. Navarrete landed 163 to Villa's 131 total punches, while the difference in power punches landed was far more pronounced, with Navarrete landing 131 to Villa's 58. During the post-fight interview, Navarette called for a title unification bout with the IBF featherweight champion Josh Warrington.

Navarrete vs. Díaz
Navarrate was booked to make his first WBO featherweight title defense against the one-time WBO junior lightweight title challenger Christopher Díaz. The fight was scheduled as the main event of an ESPN card that took place on April 24, 2021, at the Silver Spurs Arena in Kissimmee, Florida. Just as in all of his previous title defenses, Navarrete was seen as the favorite to retain, with most odds-makers having him as a -900 favorite. In front of a crowd of 3,262 people, Navarrete won the fight by a late twelfth-round technical knockout. He managed to knock Díaz a total of four times throughout the bout, with the final knockdown prompting both his corner-men and the referee to stop the fight. Navarrete landed 257 to Díaz's 183 total punches, with 241 of those being power punches.

Navarrete vs. Gonzalez
On April 27, 2021, just three days after his first title defense, it was revealed that Navarrete was in talks to face mandatory challenger Joet Gonzalez. Gonzalez had earned his mandatory status by beating the three-time world title challenger Miguel Marriaga. The fight was officially announced for the even headliner of an October 15, 2021, ESPN broadcast card, which took place at the Pechanga Arena in San Diego, California. Navarrete retained the title by unanimous decision. Two of the judges scored the fight 116–112 for Navarrete, while the third judge scored it 118–110 in his favor. Navarrete landed a hundred punches over what Gonzalez landed (272 to 169), and about fifty more power punches (204 to 150). He threw 979 punches throughout the twelve round bout, averaging 81.6 punches per round.

Navarrete vs. Baez
On June 29, 2022, it was announced that Navarrete would make his third title defense against the #7 ranked WBO featherweight Eduardo Baez. The bout was scheduled as the main event of an ESPN broadcast card, which took place at the Pechanga Arena in San Diego, California on August 20, 2022. Navarrete overcame a slow start to win the bout by a sixth-round knockout. He hit Baez with a left hook to the body in the first minute of the sixth round, which led to his opponent taking a knee and being counted out at the 1:00 minute mark. Navarrete was down on the scorecards at the time of the stoppage, with two judges having Baez ahead 50–45 and 48–47, while the third judge had Navarrete leading 49–46. He floated the idea of moving up to super featherweight in his post-fight speech, stating: "I’m going to rest because we had a difficult and hard camp. We’re going to sit down and talk about if those options include fighting at 126 or 130 pounds". The fight averaged an audience of 485,000 viewers and peaked at 494,000.

WBO junior lightweight champion

Navarrete vs. Wilson
On November 9, 2022, the WBO formally ordered Navarette to face the two-weight world champion Óscar Valdez for the vacant WBO junior lightweight championship. He wasn't stripped of his featherweight title however, as he was granted a one-fight exception to move up in weight. The vacant title bout was scheduled as the main event of an ESPN broadcast card, which took place at the Desert Diamond Arena in Glendale, Arizona on February 3, 2023. Valdez withdrew from the fight on December 13. Navarette was instead re-booked to face the once-defeated Liam Wilson for the vacant title. Despite being knocked down in the fourth round, Navarette was able to rally back and win the fight by a ninth-round technical knockout. Navarrete vacated his WBO featherweight title on February 9, 2023.

Professional boxing record

See also
List of Mexican boxing world champions
List of world super-bantamweight boxing champions
List of world featherweight boxing champions
List of world super-featherweight boxing champions
List of boxing triple champions

References

External links

Emanuel Navarrete - Profile, News Archive & Current Rankings at Box.Live

1995 births
Living people
Mexican male boxers
Flyweight boxers
Super-bantamweight boxers
Featherweight boxers
World super-bantamweight boxing champions
World featherweight boxing champions
World super-featherweight boxing champions
World Boxing Organization champions
Boxers from the State of Mexico